The Seyhan Viaduct is a  box-girder bridge that carries the O-51 motorway across the Seyhan River in Adana, Turkey. The bridge is the northernmost crossing of the river before the Seyhan Dam, just upstream.

Completed in 1992, the Seyhan Viaduct was originally built as part of the Pozantı-Adana-İskenderun motorway. Once completed, the route was re-designated as the Adana Beltway (O-50) and has recently been re-designated again, after the O-50 was replaced by the O-51 and O-52.

See also
Devlet Bahçeli Bridge

References

Bridges completed in 1992
1992 establishments in Turkey
Buildings and structures in Adana
Bridges over the Seyhan River
Road bridges in Turkey
Transport in Adana
Seyhan